The House of Israel is a Jewish community located in southwestern Ghana, in the towns of Sefwi Wiawso and Sefwi Sui. This group of people, of the Sefwi tribe, built a synagogue in 1998. Many of the men and children read English, but no one knows Hebrew.

History of Jews in Ghana

The people of Sefwi Wiawso trace a call for a "return" to normative Judaism by Aaron Ahomtre Toakyirafa, a community leader who, in 1976, is said to have had a vision. In 2012, Gabrielle Zilkha, a Toronto-based filmmaker, visited Sefwe Wiawso to do research for a documentary about the House of Israel she is making. According to Zilkha, about 200 people--mostly children--live in the community. She states that the lack of a historical record makes it difficult to verify the group's claims, but that there is an oral tradition dating back 200 years.

In the 1990s, the House of Israel began to reach out to the wider Jewish world. The community worked with Jewish organizations such as Kulanu and Be’chol Lashon.

A smaller community of Jews from the House of Israel lives in Sefwi Sui, a small farming community located twenty miles from Sefwi Wiawso.

Jewish facilities
The leader of the House of Israel since 1993, David Ahenkorah received his own vision in taking up the mantle. He has been granted a 40-acre plot of land to build a Jewish school for the community, but they have not yet been able to raise funds for construction. Children currently attend a local school, run by Christians. They built a synagogue in 1998 in New Adiembra, a Jewish neighborhood in Sefwi Wiawso. Recently, they painted it blue and white, the colors of Israel. There are several family compounds nearby and about 200 people belong to the synagogue. It is a single-room synagogue with a miniature Sefer Torah. There is no mechitza.

See also
 Beta Israel
 History of ancient Israel and Judah
 Jews of Bilad el-Sudan
 Kingdom of Israel

References

External links
Ghana, Kulanu

 
Ethnic groups in Ghana
Groups claiming Jewish descent
 
Sefwi people